was a Japanese football player and manager. He played for the Japan national team.

Club career
Mimura was born in Tokyo on 16 August 1931. After graduating from Chuo University, he founded Toho Titanium in 1955 and played for the club.

International career
On 2 January 1955, Mimura debuted for the Japan national team against Burma. He played four games for Japan in 1955. In 1956, he was selected to represent Japan in the 1956 Summer Olympics in Melbourne, but did not compete.

Coaching career
After retirement, Mimura became a manager for Toho Titanium. He led the club to win Japanese Regional Leagues four times and was promoted to Japan Soccer League two times in 1982 and 1985. At the end of 1985 season, he resigned.

Death
Mimura died on 19 February 2022, at the age of 90.

Career statistics

References

External links
 
 Japan National Football Team Database

1931 births
2022 deaths
Chuo University alumni
Association football people from Tokyo
Japanese footballers
Association football defenders
Japan international footballers
Olympic footballers of Japan
Footballers at the 1956 Summer Olympics
Toho Titanium SC players
Japanese football managers